The 1991 Arkansas Razorbacks football team represented the University of Arkansas during the 1991 NCAA Division I-A football season. Jack Crowe's team improved from a 3–8 record in 1990 to become bowl eligible again in 1991. Punter Pete Raether finished third in the nation in punting average, with 43.6 yards per boot. On the other side of the ball, punt returner Michael James averaged 14.3 yards per return, seventh in the nation.

This season would end Arkansas' tenure in the Southwest Conference. The SWC had every team except Arkansas, Rice, and Baylor hit with sanctions or recruiting scandals in the 1980s (including SMU's "Death penalty" in 1987). The conference would finally be dissolved in 1996. The Razorbacks would next call the SEC home, beginning in 1992. South Carolina also joined the SEC that year.

The Hogs would enjoy a victory over arch-rival Texas in Little Rock, 14–13, in the final game as SWC opponents.

Schedule

References

Arkansas
Arkansas Razorbacks football seasons
Arkansas Razorbacks football